When a work's copyright expires, it enters the public domain. The following is a list of works that entered the public domain in 2020. Since laws vary globally, the copyright status of some works is not uniform.

Entering the public domain in countries with life + 70 years
With the exception of Belarus (Life + 50 years) and Spain (which has a copyright term of Life + 80 years for creators that died before 1987), a work enters the public domain in Europe at the end of the calendar year following 70 years after the creator's death, if it was published during the creator's lifetime. Russia has a 4-year extension to Life+ 70 (in essence Life+74) for authors who worked during World War II in the Soviet Union. The list is sorted alphabetically and includes a notable work of the creator that entered the public domain on January 1, 2020.

Entering the public domain in countries with life + 50 years
In most countries of Africa and Asia, as well as Belarus, Bolivia, Canada, New Zealand, Egypt and Uruguay; a work enters the public domain at the end of the calendar year following 50 years after the creator's death.

{| class="wikitable sortable" border="1" style="border-spacing:0 style="width:100%"
! Names
! Country
! Birth
! Death
! Occupation
! Notable work
|-
| Alejandro G. Abadilla
| 
| 
| 
| Writer
| Ako ang Daigdig
|-
| Sargis Abrahamyan
| 
| 
| 
| Writer
| With Generations
|-
| Theodor W. Adorno
|  
| 
| 
| Philosopher
| Theodor W. Adorno bibliography
|-
| Ricardo Aguirre
| 
| 
| 
| Singer, Composer
| La Grey Zuliana
|-
| Ignacio Aldecoa
|  
| 
| 
| Author
| El fulgor y la sangre
|-
| Ikbal Ali Shah
| 
| 
| 
| Writer, diplomat
| Afghanistan of the Afghans
|-
| Edgar Anderson
|  
| 
| 
| Botanist
| Introgressive Hybridization
|-
| Charlotte Armstrong
|  
| 
| 
| Author
| A Dram of Poison
|-
| Marius Barbeau
| 
| 
| 
| Ethnographer
| Downfall of Temlaham
|-
| Daniel E. Barbey
|  
| 
| 
| Naval Officer
| MacArthur's Amphibious Navy
|-
| Arthur K. Barnes
|  
| 
| 
| Science-Fiction Writer
| Works
|-
| Emilio Bigi
| 
| 
| 
| Musician
| Renacer guarani
|-
| Charles Brackett
|  
| 
| 
| Novelist, Screenwriter
| 
|-
| Gabriel Chevallier
|  
| 
| 
| Novelist
| Clochemerle
|-
| Ivy Compton-Burnett
|   
| 
| 
| Novelist
| Manservant and Maidservant
|-
| Richmal Crompton
|  
| 
| 
| Writer, Teacher
| Just William series
|-
| Alexandra David-Néel
| 
| 
| 
| Explorer, Spiritualist
| Mystiques et magiciens du Tibet
|-
| Aleksandr Deyneka
| 
| 
| 
| Artist
| The Defense of Petrograd
|-
| Otto Dix
|  
| 
| 
| Artist
| The Trench
|-
| Duke Adolf Friedrich of Mecklenburg
|  
| 
| 
| explorer, politician
| Ins innerste Afrika
|-
| Max Eastman
|  
| 
| 
| Writer
| Reflections on the Failure of Socialism
|-
| Dwight D. Eisenhower
| 
| 
| 
| Military Officer, statesman
| Crusade in Europe
|-
| Abo El Seoud El Ebiary
|  
| 
| 
| Playwright, songwriter
| Afrita hanem
|-
| Olivia FitzRoy
|  
| 
| 
| Author of children's books
| Orders to Poach
|-
| Botong Francisco
|  
| 
| 
| Muralist
| The Progress of Medicine in the Philippines
|-
| Karl Freund
|  
| 
| 
| Cinematographer, film director
| The Mummy
|-
| Rómulo Gallegos
| 
| 
| 
| Novelist, politician
| Doña Bárbara
|-
| Witold Gombrowicz
|  
| 
| 
| Writer, playwright
| Ferdydurke
|-
| Walter Gropius
|  
| 
| 
| Architect
| Bauhaus
|-
| Wendell Hall
|  
| 
| 
| Singer-songwriter
| It Ain't Gonna Rain No Mo'
|-
|Ho Chi Minh
| 
|19 May 1890
|2 September 1969
|President
|Proclamation of Independence of the Democratic Republic of Vietnam
|-
| Karl Jaspers
|  
| 
| 
| Psychiatrist, Philosopher
| General Psychopathology
|-
| Jack Kerouac
|  
| 
| 
| Writer
| On the Road
|-
| Norman Lindsay
| 
| 
| 
| Artist, Writer
| The Magic Pudding
|-
| Frank Loesser
|  
| 
| 
| Songwriter
| Baby, It's Cold Outside, A Bushel and a Peck
|-
| Erika Mann
|  
| 
| 
| Writer, actress
| Zehn Millionen Kinder. Die Erziehung der Jugend im Dritten Reich
|-
| Gavin Maxwell
|  
| 
| 
| Author
| Ring of Bright Water
|-
| Leo McCarey
|  
| 
| 
| Film director, screenwriter
| The Bells of St. Mary's
|-
| Jimmy McHugh
|  
| 
| 
| Composer
| South American Way
|-
| Meher Baba
| 
| 
| 
| Mystic
| God Speaks
|-
| Mikio Naruse
|  
| 
| 
| Film director, screenwriter
| Apart from You
|-
| Mutesa II of Buganda
| 
| 
| 
| Statesman
| The Desecration of My Kingdom
|-
| Seabury Quinn
|  
| 
| 
| Author, lawyer
| Roads
|-
| August Sang
| 
| 
| 
| Poet
| Üks noormees otsib õnne
|-
| Muhammad Shahidullah
| 
| 
| 
| Writer, philologist
| Bangla Sahityer Katha
|-
| Ben Shahn
|  
| 
| 
| Artist
| Jersey Homesteads Mural
|-
| Osbert Sitwell
|  
| 
| 
| Writer
| Before the Bombardment
|-
| Josef von Sternberg
|  
| 
| 
| Film director
| Shanghai Express
|-
| Leonard Woolf
|  
| 
| 
| writer, publisher
| The Village in the Jungle
|-
| John Wyndham
|  
| 
| 
| Science-Fiction Writer
| The Day of the Triffids, The Midwich Cuckoos
|}

Entering the public domain in Australia

In 2004 copyright in Australia changed from a "plus 50" law to a "plus 70" law, in line with America and the European Union. But the change was not made retroactive (unlike the 1995 change in the European Union which brought some European authors back into copyright, especially those who died from 1925 to 1944). Hence the work of an author who died before 1955 is normally in the public domain in Australia; but the copyright of authors was extended to 70 years after death for those who died in 1955 or later, and no more Australian authors will come out of copyright until 1 January 2026 (those who died in 1955).

Unpublished works by authors who died in 1949 entered the public domain on 1 January 2020. Any published literary, artistic, dramatic, or musical work (other than computer programs) by a not generally known author (anonymous or pseudonymous) from 1949 also entered the public domain on that date.

Entering the public domain in the United States

Works that entered the public domain on January 1, 2020, in the United States include:
 In general, works published in 1924 (including printed music). However, sound recordings that were first made prior to February 15, 1972, are treated as a special case under US copyright law, and under the Music Modernization Act, sound recordings published in 1924 will enter the public domain in 2025.
 Books, films, and other works published in 1924 (under the Copyright Term Extension Act).
 Unpublished works whose authors died in 1949.

Some of the published works that entered the public domain include the earliest sheet music for George Gershwin's Rhapsody in Blue and Buster Keaton's silent comedy film Sherlock Jr.''

Tom Lehrer
In October 2020, satirical singer/songwriter Tom Lehrer announced the release of all of his lyrics and music to the public domain.

See also 
 List of American films of 1924
 List of countries' copyright lengths
 Public Domain Day
 Creative Commons
 Public Domain
 Over 300 public domain authors available in Wikisource (any language), with descriptions from Wikidata
 1949 in literature, 1959 in literature, 1969 in literature and 1979 in literature

References

External links

 
Popular Books of 1924 at Goodreads.

Public domain
Public domain